Manship House may refer to:

Manship House (Baton Rouge, Louisiana), listed on the National Register of Historic Places in East Baton Rouge Parish, Louisiana
Manship House (Jackson, Mississippi), listed on the National Register of Historic Places in Hinds County, Mississippi